Ishaq ibn Ali (died April 1147)  was the 8th and last Almoravid Emir who reigned shortly in 1147.

Ibrahim was the uncle of his predecessor as emir,  Ibrahim ibn Tashfin, and was killed after the conquest of  Marrakech by the Almohads. Due to repeated attacks by the Almohads, Ishaq ibn Ali had to flee to the Atlas Mountains where he took refuge in the High Atlas. After the situation calmed down, he returned to Marrakesh taking control once again however the Almohads conquered the city, killing both Ibrahim and Ishaq and establishing the Almohad Caliphate.

Sources

1147 deaths
Almoravid emirs
People from Marrakesh
12th-century Moroccan people
Year of birth unknown

12th-century Berber people